Hambach is a municipality in the district of Rhein-Lahn, in Rhineland-Palatinate, in western Germany. It belongs to the association community of Diez.

History
Hambach was first mentioned in 1290 in a necrology from "Stift St. Lubentius zu Dietkirchen".
Hambach belonged to the shire of Diez.
From 1794 temporarily occupied by the French, the village became part of the Herzogtum Nassau, which was annexed to Prussia in 1866.
Since 1946 the village is part of the Rhineland-Palatinate.

Public institutions
In 1890 a school was built, but it was closed due to short of pupils in 1936. It was reused from 1947 to 1961.
Hambach has a volunteer fire brigade, which was founded in 1971.

References

Municipalities in Rhineland-Palatinate
Rhein-Lahn-Kreis